Allison Gyle Woodruff is an American computer scientist whose work concerns human–computer interaction, information visualization, algorithmic fairness, sustainability, citizen science, and environmental monitoring. She is a user experience researcher in the Google Security & Privacy team.

Education and career
Woodruff majored in English at California State University, Chico, and has master's degrees in both linguistics and computer science from the University of California, Davis. She completed her Ph.D. in computer science in 1998 at the University of California, Berkeley, with the dissertation  Data Lineage and Information Density in Database Visualization supervised by Michael Stonebraker.

Before joining Google, she worked for Xerox PARC from 1998 to 2004, and then for Intel Research Berkeley.

Recognition
Woodruff was named to the CHI Academy in 2021.

References

External links

Year of birth missing (living people)
Living people
American computer scientists
American women computer scientists
Human–computer interaction researchers
California State University, Chico alumni
University of California, Davis alumni
University of California, Berkeley alumni
Scientists at PARC (company)